The 2008–09 Duke Blue Devils women's basketball team represented Duke University in the 2008–09 NCAA Division I basketball season. The Blue Devils were coached by Joanne P. McCallie, (also known as Coach P) and the Blue Devils played their home games at Cameron Indoor Stadium in Durham, North Carolina. The Blue Devils are a member of the Atlantic Coast Conference. The Blue Devils reached the 25-win mark for the 11th straight season, collected their 12th straight 10-win ACC season. McCallie guided Duke to a 14-0 record at home in Cameron Indoor Stadium marking only the second time in school history the Blue Devils have gone undefeated at home.  Duke was also a No. 1 seed in the NCAA Tournament for the seventh time in school history and the third time out of the last four years.

Offseason

Regular season

Roster

Schedule

Player stats

Postseason

NCAA basketball tournament
Berkeley Regional
Duke 83, Austin Peay 42
2008-09 Michigan State Spartans women's basketball team 63, Duke 49

Awards and honors
Chante Black, ACC Defensive Player of the Year
Chante Black, John R. Wooden Award finalist
Chante Black, State Farm All-America team
Chante Black, USBWA All-America first team
Chante Black, third team Associated Press All-America,
Chante Black, All-ACC
Chante Black, All-ACC Defensive team
Chante Black, midseason candidate for the Naismith Award.
Carrem Gay, All-ACC Tournament first team
Abby Waner, 2009 Robin Roberts/WBCA Broadcasting Scholarship and was a finalist for the Lowe’s Senior Class Award in 2009.
Jasmine Thomas, ESPN The Magazine Academic All-District III
Jasmine Thomas, All-ACC Academic Team honors
Abby Waner, All-ACC Tournament first team selection

Team awards
Team awards were voted on by team members and staff

Chante Black, Best Rebounder
Chante Black, Player of the Year awards
Abby Waner, Assist Maker award
Abby Waner, Best Free Throw Shooter award
Carrem Gay, Meanest Mother on the Court Award (represents the Blue Devil that does the dirty work, including assists, steals and leads the team in floor burns).
 Keturah Jackson, Best Defender award
 Karima Christmas, Sixth Player of the Year
 Karima Christmas, Most Improved

Team players drafted into the WNBA

April 23: Carrem Gay has signed a training camp contract with the Connecticut Sun of the WNBA. Gay, who is from New York, N.Y., averaged 6.6 points, 5.1 rebounds and 1.7 steals for the Blue Devils in 2008-09.

See also
2008-09 Duke Blue Devils men's basketball team

References

Duke Blue Devils women's basketball seasons
Duke
Duke